Dangerous Woman is a 2011 South Korean television series starring Ko Eun-mi, Hwang Bo-ra, Kim Jung-hyun and Yeo Hyun-soo. The morning soap opera aired on MBC on Mondays to Fridays at 7:50 a.m. from October 10, 2011, to March 30, 2012, for 124 episodes.

Plot
When everything you believed in for your entire life is a devastating lie, will you direct your anger at the person who caused it all or forgive that person? This drama tells a story about people who are hell-bent on recovering what they think is rightfully theirs, while on the opposite side, there are people who will fight to protect what belongs to them. In the beginning, the two sides hate each other's guts. They do despicable things that will make it impossible to make things right again. But there is still a sliver of hope. The pent-up anger within themselves softens, and they begin a path of rehabilitation and redemption that will allow them to forgive their enemies and bury the hatchet. This drama is not a story about revenge and anguish but rather a story of rehabilitation and harmony. Viewers will empathize with their agony and pain while also rejoicing in their happiness. The takeaway is that love is a powerful force that can conquer all.

Cast

Main 
Ko Eun-mi as Kang Yoo-ra
Hwang Bo-ra as Kang So-ra
Kim Jung-hyun as Kim Ji-won, Yoo-ra's boyfriend
Yeo Hyun-soo as Kang Dong-min, Yoo-ra's younger brother, So-ra's elder brother

Recurring 
Im Chae-moo as Kang Joo-huk, Yoo-ra and Dong-min's father, the president of Group Jin-Song
Kim Bo-yeon as Yoon Do-hee, So-ra and Dong-min's biological mother
Sunwoo Eun-sook as Na Yeon-sook, Joo-hyuk's wife, Yoo-ra and Dong-min's mother
Kim Eun-young as Mrs. Shin Bok-ja, Yeon-sook's mother, the founder of Group Jin-Song
Nam Yoon-jung as Nam Ji-sook a.k.a. Aunt Paju, the Kangs' housekeeper
Kim Young-bae as Choi Baek-hoon, a director of Group Jin-Song, So-ra's biological father
Byun Eun-young as Mrs. Bang, Do-hee's friend
Sung Woong as Lee Seo-hoon, Aunt Paju's son, So-ra's ex-boyfriend
Lee Na-eun as Lee Seo-joo, Seo-hoon's younger sister, Dong-min's girlfriend
Seo Woo-jin as PD Jo Sang-bum

Cameo 
Cho Yeon-woo as Kang Dong-joon, the son of Joo-hyuk and Yeon-sook, Yoo-ra's elder brother, accidentally killed by Seo-hoon

References

External links
 

MBC TV television dramas
2011 South Korean television series debuts
2012 South Korean television series endings
Korean-language television shows
South Korean romance television series
South Korean melodrama television series
Television series by MBC C&I